, located on the border of Kokonoe and Taketa in Ōita Prefecture, Japan, is the highest mountain in Kyushu Island, Japan, with a summit elevation of . It is one of the 100 Famous Japanese Mountains. It is part of the Aso-Kujū National Park.

Summary 
The Kujū range consists of a dozen or so volcanic bodies gathered in a region of 13km east-west and 10km north-south. The mountains in the range include:
Kujū Mountains
Mount Kujū (1,787 m)- The main peak (久住山)
Mount Nakadake (1,791 m)- The highest peak in Kyushu
Mount Inahoshi (1,774 m)
Mount Hōsshō (1,762 m)
Mount Mimata (1,745 m)
Taisen Mountains
Mount Taisen (1,786 m)
Mount North (Kita) Taisen (1,706 m)
Mount Heiji (1,642 m)
The Kujū volcanic group is mainly composed of andesite and dacite, which is defined as the volcanic activity above the Miyagi pyroclastic flow deposit which formed about 200,000 years ago. The north and south areas of Mt. Kujū are plateau grasslands whose main industry is dairy farming.

Gallery

See also
 List of Ultras of Japan

References

External links

 Kujusan - Japan Meteorological Agency 
  - Japan Meteorological Agency
 Kuju - Geological Survey of Japan
 

Volcanoes of Kyushu
Mountains of Ōita Prefecture
Stratovolcanoes of Japan
Pleistocene stratovolcanoes
Holocene stratovolcanoes